Liis Jürgens (Viira) (born Jürgens; years 2010-2020 Viira; born April 7, 1983) is an Estonian composer, harpist, and animator. She has also used the pseudonym Liz Wirestring.

Life and career
Liis Jürgens has written quite diverse music for orchestras and choirs as well as chamber music and electroacoustic improvisations. Despite being one of the best-known harp players in Estonia and a member of Estonian State Symphony Orchestra, she often uses harp along with non-classical instruments. She has admitted her compositions for human voice are difficult for singers as she uses voice like just another instrument. Jürgens tends to stress the importance of lyrics, and has often composed her own due to lack of poetry intrinsically harmonic with the music.

Jürgens has also been playing in ensembles Una Corda and Lippajad.

She has composed music for film, like Eleonore de Montesquieu's documentary Paldiski (2005). In 2012, Viira's Liivaterade raamat represented Estonia on International Rostrum of Composers run yearly by International Music Council.

In the end of 2015, Viira and Margo Kõlar gained a lot of media coverage with their Baby Symphony (Reverbeebi) presented on Estonian Music Days. In that project consisting of several small compositions, babies' voices were used along with the instruments and lyrics by Doris Kareva. The premiere was presented by Collegium Musicale chamber choir and accompanied by dancers from Tallinn Ballet School. Later, it was used as a musical installation in Estonian Theatre and Music Museum. Her newer composition, Root Bridge (2016), mixing instruments with voice improvisation and led by Robert Jürjendal on touch guitar, was characterized by music critic Maria Mölder as a "unique breathtaking world of sound achieved by the harmony of different instruments", based on a "less is more" approach.

Education 
 2005/2006 as an exchange student in University of Music and Performing Arts Vienna with professor Adelheid Blovsky-Miller's harp class
 Since 2012, Estonian Academy of Arts (animation)

Works 
 Half-Mirrors (1998)
 Port Area (2001)
 RedBlueYellow (2002)
 Labyrinth Harp Play (2002)
 Coastline (2003)
 Lullaby (2004)
 Invisible (2005)
 Streamline (2006/2007)
 digitalis purpurea (2007)
 Honeycomb Music (2008)
 Butterfly Cathers
 Snowy Christmas
 Spider Tectonics
 Chaconne, or 50 Rounds to the Health of Erkki Sven
 Liivaterade raamat (Book of Sand Grains, 2012)
 Baby Symphony (2015, with Margo Kõlar)
 Kaheksa (Eight, 2016)

References

Literature
 Liis Jürgens Võlurite ring. Ansambel U: kontserdist Muusika 2/2005, p. 18 (A review by Liis Jürgens)

External links 
 Liis Viira, Association of Estonian Professional Musicians
 Liis Viira, Eesti Muusika Infokeskus (in Estonian)
 Liis Viira and Margo Kõlar on their Baby Symphony, Postimees, March 25, 2016 (in Estonian)
 Maria Mölder Juurtest sild ja teised, review of Liis Viira's Eight in Sirp, February 5, 2016 (in Estonian)
 Kristi Rebane Interview with Liis Viira, Postimees, 2015 (in Estonian)
 Timo Steiner, Margo Kõlar, and Liis Viira discussing Baby Symphony on Estonian Public Broadcasting, April 9, 2015 
 NYYD-MUUSIKA. Liis Viira "Liivaterade raamat", radio show on Estonian National Broadcasting, 2012 (in Estonian)
 Liis Jürgens, Teater. Muusika. Kino, No. 2, 2009

Harpists
1983 births
Living people
Women classical composers
Women harpists
Musicians from Tallinn
Estonian Academy of Music and Theatre alumni
21st-century Estonian composers
21st-century Estonian musicians
21st-century women composers